The 1921–22 season was Liverpool's 26th season in existence, they went on to win their third league title. The club also reached the second round of the FA Cup before being knocked out by West Bromwich Albion.

References 

1921-22
Liverpool
English football championship-winning seasons